Hoplostethus crassispinus is a species of slimehead found in the Pacific Ocean. It can be found in Hawaii and the Kyushu–Palau Ridge and possibly off the coast of Vietnam. It lives at depths between 280m and 600m and can reach sizes of up to 25.4 cm.

References

External links
 

crassispinus
Fish described in 1980
Fish of the Pacific Ocean